SARM Division No. 1 is a division of the Saskatchewan Association of Rural Municipalities (SARM) within the province of Saskatchewan, Canada.  It is located in the south east area of the province. There are 53 rural municipalities in this division. The current director for Division 1 is William Huber.

List of Rural Municipalities in SARM Division No. 1

by numerical RM #

 RM No. 1 Argyle
 RM No. 2 Mount Pleasant
 RM No. 3 Enniskillen
 RM No. 4 Coalfields
 RM No. 5 Estevan
 RM No. 6 Cambria
 RM No. 7 Souris Valley
 RM No. 31 Storthoaks
 RM No. 32 Reciprocity
 RM No. 33 Moose Creek
 RM No. 34 Browning
 RM No. 35 Benson
 RM No. 36 Cymri
 RM No. 37 Lomond
 RM No. 61 Antler
 RM No. 63 Moose Mountain
 RM No. 64 Brock
 RM No. 65 Tecumseh
 RM No. 66 Griffin
 RM No. 67 Weyburn
 RM No. 91 Maryfield
 RM No. 92 Walpole
 RM No. 93 Wawken
 RM No. 94 Hazelwood
 RM No. 95 Golden West
 RM No. 96 Fillmore
 RM No. 97 Wellington
 RM No. 121 Moosomin
 RM No. 122 Martin
 RM No. 123 Silverwood
 RM No. 124 Kingsley
 RM No. 125 Chester
 RM No. 126 Montmartre
 RM No. 127 Francis
 RM No. 151 Rocanville
 RM No. 152 Spy Hill
 RM No. 153 Willowdale
 RM No. 154 Elcapo
 RM No. 155 Wolseley
 RM No. 156 Indian Head
 RM No. 157 South Qu'Appelle
 RM No. 181 Langenburg
 RM No. 183 Fertile Belt
 RM No. 184 Grayson
 RM No. 185 McLeod
 RM No. 186 Abernethy
 RM No. 187 North Qu'Appelle
 RM No. 211 Churchbridge
 RM No. 213 Saltcoats
 RM No. 214 Cana
 RM No. 215 Stanley
 RM No. 216 Tullymet
 RM No. 217 Lipton

Footnotes

External links
SARM Division No. 1 members

SARM divisions of Saskatchewan